Crossfield is a town in the Calgary Metropolitan Region of Alberta, Canada that is surrounded by Rocky View County.

As a rail station on the Calgary to Edmonton (C&E) line of the Canadian Pacific Railway, Crossfield was founded in 1892. Crossfield was named after an engineer with the Canadian Pacific Railway survey crew. By 1904, the community had a post office, a general store, a hotel and a school.  In 1906, the first grain elevator opened and Crossfield was incorporated as a village the following year in 1907. In 1980, Crossfield incorporated as a town.

The Town of Crossfield is a member of the Calgary Metropolitan Region Board. Crossfield is within the Calgary-Edmonton Corridor and is growing as a result. Crossfield is north of the City of Airdrie and south of the Town of Olds. Crossfield is surrounded by the rural Rocky View County.

Demographics 

In the 2016 Census of Population conducted by Statistics Canada, the Town of Crossfield recorded a population of 2,983 living in 1,101 of its 1,168 total private dwellings, a  change from its 2011 population of 2,853.

Economy 
The primary economic base of the Crossfield area is agriculture, agricultural services and natural gas processing. The Crossfield Gas Plant located south of the town, currently owned by TAQA North, has been operation since 1965.

Education 
Crossfield has two schools: Crossfield Elementary School, which teaches children from kindergarten to grade five, and WG Murdoch School, which teaches children from grades six to 12.

The town also has a preschool that is situated next to the Crossfield Elementary School.

See also 
List of communities in Alberta
List of towns in Alberta

References 

Karamitsanis, Aphrodite (1992). Place Names of Alberta – Volume II, Southern Alberta, University of Calgary Press, Calgary, Alberta.
Read, Tracey (1983). Acres and Empires – A History of the Municipal District of Rocky View, Calgary, Alberta.

External links 

1907 establishments in Alberta
Calgary Region
Rocky View County
Towns in Alberta